Neafrapus is a genus of swift in the family Apodidae. 
It contains the following species:
 Böhm's spinetail (Neafrapus boehmi)
 Cassin's spinetail (Neafrapus cassini)

 
Bird genera
 
Taxonomy articles created by Polbot